Polina Kozitskiy (born 29 December 1995) was an American individual rhythmic gymnast. She represented her nation at international competitions.

She competed at world championships, including at the 2011 World Rhythmic Gymnastics Championships.

References

External links
 https://usagym.org/pages/athletes/athleteListDetail.html?id=247672
 https://database.fig-gymnastics.com/public/gymnasts/biography/14523/true?backUrl=%2Fpublic%2Fresults%2Fdisplay%2F1862%3FidAgeCategory%3D6%26idCategory%3D76%23anchor_2116
 http://www.zimbio.com/pictures/ycG5FIrg6UO/2011+Visa+Championships+Rhythmic+Gymnastics/seTz_vphrlP/Polina+Kozitskiy
 https://www.youtube.com/watch?v=EzFMow4ywC4

1995 births
Living people
American rhythmic gymnasts
Place of birth missing (living people)
Gymnasts at the 2010 Summer Youth Olympics
21st-century American women